Leptotrichia trevisanii is an aerotolerant, filamentous and non-motile bacterium from the genus of Leptotrichia which has been isolated from human blood.

References

Fusobacteriota
Bacteria described in 2002